Andrew David "Drew" Baglino is a manufacturing industry executive working in the field of new energy.   Baglino is the Senior Vice President of Powertrain and Energy Engineering at Tesla.

While studying at Stanford University in the early-2000s Baglino undertook research on Hydrogen as a transport fuel in New Zealand.
Upon finishing at Stanford, Baglino received a bachelor's degree in electrical engineering, and became a research assistant at Resources for the Future.

Baglino moved to Tesla in 2006 as an electrical engineer in San Carlos, California.  At Tesla he worked on digital test equipment and motor control firmware leading to performance improvements on the 2008 Tesla Roadster.
Baglino designed the dual motor system for the Tesla Model S, and powertrain control algorithms. By November 2014, Baglino was director of engineering for Tesla Energy.  he was also leading the electrical and control side for Tesla grid-tied battery products.

References

Further reading

 
 Patents filed by Andrew David Baglino, via Google Patents

Living people
Stanford University School of Engineering alumni
Tesla, Inc. people
Year of birth missing (living people)